is a passenger railway station operated by the Takamatsu-Kotohira Electric Railroad in Takamatsu, Kagawa, Japan. .  It is operated by the private transportation company Takamatsu-Kotohira Electric Railroad (Kotoden) and is designated station "K10".

Lines
Okamoto Station is a statin on the Kotoden Kotohira Line and is located 13.8 km from the opposing terminus of the line at Takamatsu-Chikkō Station.

Layout
The station consists of two opposed side platforms connected by a level crossing. The station is unattended.

Adjacent stations

History
Okamoto Station opened on December 21, 1926 as a station of the Kotohira Electric Railway. On November 1, 1943 it became  a station on the Takamatsu Kotohira Electric Railway Kotohira Line due to a company merger.

Surrounding area
Kagawa Prefectural Route 282 Takamatsu Kotohira Line
Kagawa Prefectural Road No. 39 Kokubunji Nakadori Line
Japan National Route 32

Passenger statistics

See also
 List of railway stations in Japan

References

External links

  

Railway stations in Japan opened in 1926
Railway stations in Takamatsu